Turn to Stone:

Petrifaction in mythology and fiction
"Turn to Stone" (Joe Walsh and Barnstorm song)
"Turn to Stone" (Electric Light Orchestra song)
Turn to Stone (album), by Pentagram